The Chandler Bookstore is a historic building in Chandler, Oklahoma. It was designed in the Late Victorian architectural style, and built in 1903 by A. E. Mascho as a dry goods store. It later became a bookstore run by Mascho's descendant, Bill. It has been listed on the National Register of Historic Places since April 5, 1984.

References

Bookstores of the United States
Commercial buildings completed in 1903
National Register of Historic Places in Lincoln County, Oklahoma
1903 establishments in Oklahoma Territory
Victorian architecture in Oklahoma
Chandler, Oklahoma